Tablighi Jamaat (also translated as "propagation party" or "preaching party")that focuses on exhorting Muslims to be more religiously observant
and encouraging fellow members to return to practising their religion as per the Islamic prophet Muhammad, and secondarily give dawah (calling) to non-Muslims.
"One of the most widespread Sunni" islah (reform, and called "one of the most influential religious movements in 20th-century Islam,"
the organisation is estimated to have between 12 and 80 million adherents worldwide, 
in over 150 countries, 
with the majority living in South Asia.

The group encourages its followers to undertake short-term preaching missions (khuruj), lasting from a few days to a few months in groups of usually forty days and four months, to preach to Muslims reminding them of "the core teachings of the Prophet Muhammad" and encourage them to attend mosque prayers and sermons. Members "travel, eat, sleep, wash and pray together in the mosques and often observe strict regimens relating to dress and personal grooming".

Established in 1926 by Muhammad Ilyas al-Kandhlawi, in the Mewat region of India, it has roots in the Deobandi reformist tradition, and developed as a response to the perceived deterioration of moral values and the supposed neglect of aspects of Islam. The movement aims for the spiritual reformation of Islam by working at the grassroots level. The teachings of Tabligh Jamaat are expressed in "Six Principles": Kalimah (Declaration of faith), Salah (Prayer), Ilm-o-zikr (Reading and Remembrance), Ikraam-e-Muslim (Respect for Muslims), Ikhlas-e-Niyyat (Sincerity of intention), and Dawat-o-Tableegh (Proselytization).

Tablighi Jamaat denies any political affiliation, involvement in debate over political or Islamic doctrine such as fiqh, 
let alone terrorism. It maintains its focus is on the study of the sacred scriptures of Islam: the Quran and the Hadith, and that the personal spiritual renewal that results will lead to reformation of society. However, the group has been accused of maintaining political links, and being used by members of Islamist terrorist organisations to recruit operatives.

History
The emergence of Tablighi Jamaat also coincided closely with the rise of various Hindu revivalist movements such as Shuddhi (purification) and Sanghatan (consolidation) launched in the early twentieth century to reconvert Hindus who had converted to Islam and Christianity. Tablighi Jamaat has been called a "missionary offshoot" of the revivalist Deobandi movement of India.

Origin
Muhammad Ilyas, the founder of Tablighi Jamaat, wanted to create a movement that would enjoin good and forbid evil as the Quran decreed, as his teacher Rasheed Ahmad Gangohi dreamed of doing. The inspiration for this came to Ilyas in a dream during his second pilgrimage to Mecca in 1926.

Ilyas abandoned his teaching post at Madrasah Mazahir Uloom in Saharanpur and became a missionary for reforming Muslims (but he did not advocate preaching to non-Muslims). He relocated near Dargah Hazrat Nizamuddin in Delhi, where this movement was formally launched in 1926, or 1927. When setting the guidelines for the movement, he sought inspiration from the practices adopted by Muhammad at the dawn of Islam. Muhammad Ilyas put forward the slogan, "O Muslims, become [true] Muslims!". This expressed the central focus of Tablighi Jamat: their aim to renew Muslims by socially by trying to unite them in embracing the lifestyle of Muhammad. The movement gained a following in a relatively short period and nearly 25,000 people attended the annual conference in November 1941.

At the time, some Muslim Indian leaders feared that Muslims were losing their religious identity and were heedless of Islamic rituals (mainly daily prayers). The movement was never given any name officially, but Ilyas called it Tahrik-i Imaan. Muhammad Ilyas died in 1945 and he himself is buried in the Nizām Ad-Dīn Mosque.

The Mewat region where Tablighi Jamaat started around Delhi was inhabited by the Meos, a Rajput ethnic group, some of whom had converted to Islam, and then re-converted to Hinduism when Muslim political power declined in the region, lacking the necessary acumen (according to one author, Ballard) required to resist the cultural and religious influence of majority Hindus, prior to the arrival of Tablighi Jamaat.

Expansion

The group began to expand its activities in 1946. The initial expansion within South Asia happened immediately after the partition of India in 1947, when the Pakistan Chapter was established in the hinterlands of Raiwind town near Lahore, Pakistan. The Pakistan Chapter remained the largest until Bangladesh became independent from Pakistan in 1971. Today, the largest Chapter is Bangladesh followed by the second largest in Pakistan. Within two decades of its establishment, the group reached Southwest and Southeast Asia, Africa, Europe, and North America. The Tablighi Jamaat's aversion to politics, and also its lack of any direct and practical economic-political-social viewpoints, helped it enter and operate in societies, especially western countries and societies where politically active religious groups faced restrictions.

Foreign missions
The first foreign missions were sent to the Hejaz (western Saudi Arabia) and Britain in 1946. The United States followed and during the 1970s and 1980s the Tablighi Jamaat also established a large presence in continental Europe. In France it was introduced in the 1960s, and grew significantly in the two decades following 1970.

In France, as of 2004, it was represented on the French Council of the Muslim Faith. During the first half-decade of the 21st century Tablighi Jamaat went through a major revival in France, reaching 100,000 followers by 2006. However, the United Kingdom is the current focus of the movement in Europe, primarily due to the large South Asian population that began to arrive there in the 1960s. By 2007, Tablighi Jamaat members were situated at 600 of Britain's 1,350 mosques.

After the collapse of the Soviet Union in 1991, the movement made inroads into Central Asia. As of 2007, it was estimated that 10,000 Tablighi Jamaat members could be found in Kyrgyzstan.

Pew Research Center estimates there are between 12 and 80 million adherents, spread across more than 150 countries. By some measures this made Tablighi Jamaat the largest Muslim movement in the World. The majority of the followers of the Tablighi Jamaat live in South Asia. It is estimated that nearly 50,000 members of Tablighi Jamaat are active in the United States.

Beliefs and objectives
Members of Tabligh Jamat are allowed to follow their own fiqh as long as it does not deviate from Sunni Islam. Tablighi Jamaat defines its objective with reference to the concept of Dawah, the proselytizing or preaching of Islam. Tablighi Jamaat interprets Dawah as enjoining good and forbidding evil only and defines its objective within the framework of two particular Qur'anic verses which refer to this mission. Those two verses are:

Six Attributes (Sifāt)

When Tablighi Jamaat visits a village or neighborhood, it invites the local Muslims to assemble in the mosque to hear their message in the form of "Six Attributes". These six Attributes were derived from the lives of the companions of Muhammad, since Muslims believe Sahabah (companions) are the best human beings after Muhammad—It is stated in one hadith, "My Sahabah (companions) are like [guiding] stars, whosoever follows [any] one of them will be guided." The Six Sifāt are basically a discussion about six special Attributes that when achieved, will just make it easy to follow the entire Dīn. These objectives are:
 Kalimah — "An article of faith in which the tabligh accepts that there is no god but Allah and the Prophet Muhammad is His messenger" (lā ilāha illā -llāh  Muḥammadur rasūlu -llāh);
 Salah (aka Namaz) —  Performing the five daily prescribed ritual prayers "that are essential to spiritual elevation, piety, and a life free from the ills of the material world";
 Ilm with Zikr (knowledge and remembrance of Allah) — This involves "sessions in which the congregation listens to preaching by the emir, performs prayers, recites the Quran and reads Hadith". The congregation will also use In addition the congregation will eat meals together during these sessions to  foster "a sense of community and identity";
 Ikram al-Muslim (Honoring Muslims) — Treating fellow Muslims "with honor and deference";
 Ikhlas-i-Niyyah (Monotheism and Intention) – "Reforming one's life in supplication to Allah by performing every human action for the sake of Allah and toward the goal of self-transformation";
 Dawah & Tabligh  (Invitation and Conveyance), also Tafrigh-i-Waqt (sparing time) — Inviting and Preaching – "The sparing of time to live a life based on faith and learning its virtues, following in the footsteps of Muhammad, and taking His message door to door for the sake of faith",

Activities, traditions, methodology

The activism of Tablighi Jamaat can be characterised by the last of the Six Principles. This principle, Tafrigh-i-Waqt (English: sparing of time) justifies the withdrawal from World, though temporarily, for travelling. Travel has been adopted as the most effective method of personal reform and has become an emblematic feature of organisation. They describe the purpose of this retreat as to patch the damages caused by the worldly indulgence and occasionally use the dry-dock parable to explain this.

These individual jamaats, each led by an ameer, are sent from each markaz across the city or country to remind people to persist on the path of God. The duration of the work depends on the discretion of each jamaat. A trip can take an evening, a couple of days or a prolonged duration.

Khurūj (proselytising tour)
largest Islamic movement, Tabligh Jamaat encourages its followers to follow the pattern of spending "ten nights a month (Ashra),120 continuous days a year (Teen Chilla), and ultimately 150 days (5 Maah- Beroon) in tabligh missions". During the course of these tours, members are generally seen dressed in simple, white, loose-clothing, carrying sleeping bags on their backs. These members use mosques as their base during this travel but particular mosques, due to more frequent tablighiyat activities, have come to be specifically associated with this organisation. These mosques generally hold the periodic, smaller scale convocations for neighbourhood members.

During their stay in mosques, these jamaats conduct a daily gasht, which involves visiting local neighbourhoods, preferably with the help of a guide called as rehbar. They invite people to attend the Maghrib prayer at their mosque and those who attend are delivered a sermon after the prayers, which essentially outlines the Six Principles. They urge the attendees to spend time in tabligh for self reformation and the propagation of Islam.

Generally, the assumed role of these jamaat members cycle in a way that they may be engaged as a preacher, a cook or as a cleaner at other times. Among Tabligh Jamaat members, this is generally referred to as khidmat which essentially connotes to serving their companions and freeing them for tablighi engagements. The members of the Jamaat are assigned these roles based on the day's mashwara. The markaz keeps records of each jamaat and its members, the identity of whom is verified from their respective mosques. Mosques are used to assist the tablighi activities of individual jamaats that voluntarily undertake preaching missions. Members of a jamaat, ideally, pay expenses themselves so as to avoid financial dependence on anyone.

Ijtema (annual gathering)

An annual gathering of followers, called ijtema, is summoned at headquarters of the respective countries. A typical ijtema continues for three days and ends with an exceptionally long prayer. These gatherings are considered moments of intense blessings by Tabligh Jamaat members and are known to attract members in excess of 2 million in some countries. The oldest ijtema of the World started in Bhopal, capital city of Madhya Pradesh, India. It attracts people from all over World. Almost 2 million people gather for this annual gathering. The largest of such annual gatherings is held in Bangladesh. The Bengali gathering, called Bishwa Ijtema (World Gathering), converges followers from around the World in Tongi near Dhaka, Bangladesh, with an attendance exceeding 3 million people. In 2018 there was an ijtema in Aurangabad in India which changed the whole scenario of tablighi with minimum attendance of 4 million people gather from around the world under the patronage of Maulana saad khandalwi  of nizamuddin markaz. The second largest Tabligh Jamaat gathering takes place in Raiwind, Pakistan which was attended by approximately 1.5 million people in 2004. In 2011 Pakistan divided the Ijtema into two parts and a total of 1 million people attended each of the two Ijtema.

Methodology
The method adopted by Muhammad Ilyas was to organise units (called jamaats,  meaning Assembly) of at least ten persons and send them to various villages or neighborhoods to preach. These outings, Dawah tours (see below), are now organised by Tablighi Jamaat leaders. In these tours, emphasis is laid on "A hadith about virtues of action" (imitating Muhammad). In the ahadith (reported sayings of Muhammad) of fazail (virtues) these has been called Eemaan (faith) and Ihtisab (for the sake of Allah) and Tablighi Jamaat believes this is the most vital deriving force for reward in akhirah (afterlife).
The Tablighi Jamaat founder Ilyas preached that knowledge of virtues and A'amalu-Saliha (Good Deeds and Actions) takes precedence over the knowledge of Masa'il (jurisprudence). Knowing jurisprudence detail (Fara'id (mandates) and Sunan (traditions) of Salat) is useful only if a person is ready to perform rituals such as offering Salat.
They insist that the best way of learning is teaching and encouraging others, with the books prescribed by Tabligi Jamaat Movement in the light of Quran and Hadith stories of Prophets, Sahaba (Companions of Prophet) and Awlia Allah ("Friends of Allah").  A collection of books, usually referred as Tablighi Nisaab (Tablighi Curriculum), is recommended by Tabligh Jamaat elders for general reading. This set includes four books namely (Hayatus Sahabah, Fazail-e-Amaal, Fazail-e-Sadqaat and Muntakhab Ahadith).

In its early days and in South Asia, the Tabligh movement aimed to return to orthodoxy and "purify" the Muslim religio-cultural identity of heterodox or "borderline" Muslims who still practised customs and religious rites connected with Hinduism. Especially to counteract the efforts of Hindu proselytising movements who targeted these often recently converts from Hinduism. Unlike common proselytising movements, Tablighi Jamaat has mostly focused on making Muslims 'better and purer' and ideally "religiously perfect", rather than preaching to the non-Muslims. This is because (it believes) dawah to non-Muslims will only be effective (or will be much more effective) when a Muslim reaches "perfection".

Organisation

Tablighi Jamaat follows an informal organisational structure and keeps an introvert institutional profile.
It has been described as "a free-floating religious movement with minimal dependence on hierarchy, leadership positions, and decision-making procedures."
It keeps its distance from mass media and avoids publishing details about its activities and membership. The group also exercises complete abstinence from expressing opinions on political and controversial issues mainly to avoid the disputes which would accompany these endorsements. As an organisation, Tabligh Jamaat does not seek donations and is not funded by anyone, in fact members have to bear their own expenditures. Since there is no formal registration process and no official membership count has ever been taken, the exact membership statistics remain unknown. The movement discourages interviews with its elders and has never officially released texts, although there are publications associated with the movement (usually referred as Tablighi Nisaab [Tablighi Curriculum]). The emphasis has never been on book learning, but rather on first-hand personal communication.

The organisation's activities are coordinated through centres called Markaz. It also has country wise centres in over 200 countries to co-ordinate its activities. These centres organize volunteer, self-funding people in groups (called jamaats), averaging ten to twelve people, for reminding Muslims to remain steadfast on path of Allah. These jamaats and preaching missions are self funded by their respective members.

Ameer is title of supervisor (doyen) in the Tabligh Jamaat and the attribute largely sought is the quality of faith, rather than the worldly rank. The ameer of Tabligh Jamaat is appointed for life by a central consultative council (shura) and elders of the Tabligh Jamaat. The first ameer was Maulana (cleric) Muhammad Ilyas Kandhalawi, later succeeded by his son Maulana (cleric) Muhammad Yusuf Kandhalawi and then by Maulana (cleric) Inaam ul Hasan the current Ameer is the great-grandson Maulana Saad Kandhalawi. During sometime in 1992, 3 years before the time of his demise, Maulana (cleric) Inamul Hasan, formed a 10-member Shura (committee) to appoint an ameer. This 10 member shura committee consisted of Maulana Saeed Ahmed Khan Sb, Mufti Zainul Abideen, Maulana Umar sb palanpuri, Maulana Izhar ul Hasan, Maulana Zubair ul hasan, Miyaji Mehraab sb, Haji Abdul Wahab Sb, Haji engineer Abdul Muqeet sb, Haji Afzal sb and Muhammad Saad Kandhlawi, Dr. Khalid Siddiqui Aligarh

Role of women
In Tablighi Jamaat, women are encouraged to stay home, and to choose a life of "segregation between female and male". However they also engage in proselytizing activities, discussing among themselves in small groups the basics of Tabligh and traveling with their husbands (or another mahram) on proselytizing trips. Tabligh inculcates in them that dawah is also important alongside taking care of their spouses or taking care of their children.

According to a 1996 study by Barbara Metcalf, the Tablighi Jamaat has encouraged women to participate since the beginning of the movement. Some scholars objected to the participation of women, but Muhammad Ilyas slowly gained their support and the first jamaat of women was formed in Nizamuddin, Delhi. Accompanied by a close male relative, (mahram), women are encouraged to go out in jamaats and work among other women and family members while following the rules of modesty, seclusion and segregation. They observe strict rules of hijab by covering their faces and hands. Jamaats of women sometimes participate in large annual meetings; otherwise, they commonly hold neighbourhood meetings.

Tablighi Jamaat tends to blur the boundaries of gender roles and both genders share a common behavioural model and their commitment to tabligh. The emphasis is on a common nature and responsibilities shared by both genders. Just as men redraw the gender roles when they wash and cook during the course of da'wa tours, women undertake the male responsibility of sustaining the household. Women do not play any role in the higher echelons of the movement, but their opinions are taken into due considerations. Women and the family members are being to told to learn Quran and follow 5 Amaals in every day life, Taleem of Ahadees, Quran recitation, 6 Points muzakera, and mashwara for daily life work and fikr for the whole world as people from around the world will be coming and they are the one who has to learn before they teach.

Criticism and controversy

Lack of political activism 
Tabligh Jamaat has been criticised—especially by Hizb ut-Tahrir and Jamaat-e-Islami—for their neutral political stance and failure to assist Islamist forces in the fight against secular or non-Islamist opponents.  Specifically they criticise the Tabligh Jamaat's neutral position towards issues in South Asia such as the introduction of an Islamic constitution in Pakistan (1950s), Islam vs Socialism (1969–1971), communal riots in India in the 1970s and 1980s, the Khatm-e-Nabuwwat Movement (1974), and Nizam-e-Mustafa Movement (1977). The Tablighi Jamaat, in response, states that it is only by avoiding the political debates that the Tablighi Jamaat has been successful in reawakening the spiritual conscience of the followers. The apolitical stance also helped them operate in difficult times, such as during the governments of Ayub Khan (1960s) and Indira Gandhi (1975–77), when other sociopolitical Islamic groups faced restrictions.

The difference of opinion regarding political participation also marks the fundamental difference between the Tablighi Jamaat and Islamist movements. While the Islamists believe that the acquisition of political power is the absolute requirement for the establishment of an Islamic society, the Tablighi Jamaat believes that mere political power is not enough to ensure effective organisation of the Islamic social order. The exclusive focus of the Tablighi Jamaat's attention is the individual, and members believe the reformation of society and institutions will only be effective through education and reform of individuals. They insist that nations and social systems exist by the virtue of the individuals who form them; therefore, the reform must begin at the grass-roots with individuals and not at the higher level of political structure.

Nasiruddin Albani in his book "Darsush Shaikhul Albani" talks about Tabligh Jamaat's aloofness from politics,

Ideological opposition
Tablighi Jamaat has received criticism in the Indian subcontinent from the Barelvi movement. One of the main criticisms against them is that the men neglect and ignore their families, especially by going out on da'wa tours. Tablighi Jamaat participants, in response, argue that both genders should be equally engaged in Tabligh. They further say that women, like men, are also urged to carry the responsibility of Tabligh and that men should facilitate women's participation by providing childcare.

Tablighi Jamaat has been criticised for being retrogressive. The women in the movement observe hijab for which the movement has been accused of keeping women "strictly subservient and second string".

Before the rule of Prince Muhammad bin Salman, Salafist and Wahhabi ulema in Saudi Arabia issued rulings "declaring Tablighis to be deviants and forbidding participation in Tablighi activities unless the reason for the participation is to criticize" the alleged deviancy. They also issued fatwa prohibiting Tablighi literature and preaching in that country.

Allegations of extremism
Denials of extremism
Tablighi Jamaat focuses on religion and generally avoids political activities and debates, claiming that the reformation of society will be achieved through personal spiritual renewal. It has been criticized by some Muslims for being too pacifist/quietist.
Its leaders have denied any links with terrorism, denounced Al-Qaeda,
but admit to not controlling its membership.

At least three western experts on Islam have testified to its apolitical, quietist and/or peaceful character:
"peaceful and apolitical preaching-to-the-people movement" (Graham E. Fuller).
"completely apolitical and law abiding" (Olivier Roy).
"an apolitical, quietist movement of internal grassroots missionary renewal" (Barbara D. Metcalf).
According to the American Foreign Policy Council (AFPC), the Tablighi Jamaat teaches that jihad is "primarily as personal purification rather than as holy warfare". Because of its disavowal of violent jihad, the Tablighi activities have been banned in Saudi Arabia and some Islamist groups have accused the Tabligh of weakening support for jihad amongst Muslims.

Connections to extremism
However, according to Stratfor Global Intelligence, as of 2008,  Tablighi Jamaat  has been connected to  terrorism plots such as 
the 2008 Barcelona terror plot; "some media reports" stated that a Muslim leader in the city stated that the fourteen suspects arrested by police in a series of raids (where bomb-making materials were seized) were members of the Tablighi Jamaat; However the plot was later credibly denied and the defendants were released. This seems to have been a case of over-zealous police work.
the October 2002 Portland Seven;  
the September 2002 Lackawanna or Buffalo Six case;
the August 2006 transatlantic aircraft plot; 
the 7 July 2005 London bombings; (the two leading members of this terrorist group — Mohammed Siddique Khan and Shahzad Tanweer -- "had life-changing experiences through their exposure to TJ", but then left "because they found it to be too apolitical");
the July 2007 London car bombs in London and Glasgow, Scotland.
Other accusations of connections to terrorism include that
the founders of terrorist group Harkat-ul-Mujahideen were members of the Tablighi Jamaat and over 6,000 Tablighis are estimated to have been trained in Harkat-ul-Mujahideen terrorist camps in Pakistan, according to Pakistani security analysts and Indian investigators.
some of the terrorist involved in the 9/11 terrorist attack had stayed in the premises of the Tablighi Jamaat centre in New Delhi. The Tablighi Jamaat was also suspected of involvement in the Godhra train burning in 2002, which killed 59 Hindu pilgrims.
following the 2010 Ahmadiyya mosques massacre in Pakistan, the minister of law in Punjab, stated the attackers had stayed with the Tablighi Jamaat.
Rizwan Farook, one of the perpetrators of the 2015 San Bernardino attack, was a student of the teachings of Tablighi Jamaat.

Tablighi members who have been charged with terrorism include: Zacarias Moussaoui (charged in the United States in the 11 September attacks), Hervé Djamel Loiseau (French citizen found in Afghanistan), and Djamel Beghal (Algerian-born French citizen and Al Qaeda member who was convicted of plotting to blow up the U.S. Embassy in Paris), Syed Rizwan Farook. In a foiled January 2008 bombing plot in Barcelona, Spain, "some media reports" stated that a Muslim leader in the city stated that the fourteen suspects arrested by police in a series of raids (where bomb-making materials were seized) were members of the Tablighi Jamaat.

At the same time, many outside observers have described the group as "apolitical" at least in part because it avoids media and government notice, operates largely in secrecy, and has missionaries that lead austere lifestyles.
Explanation for any connection

Fred Burton, Scott Stewart, Mumtaz Ahmad, and Shireen Khan Burki explain the connection between TJ and jihadism by the fact that 
TJ shares much with groups that have been accused of breeding jihadis -- Salafis, Wahhabis and other 'revivalist' Islamist movements.  They share the same conservative Islamic values and lifestyle, strict Islamic belief system and rejection of secularism; they "share the same core ideology and ultimate objectives (the expansion of Dar al Islam and the establishment of a global Caliphate)".  According to US officials (the U.S. Government has closely monitored Tablighi Jamaat since September 2001), though the Tablighis do not have a direct link with terrorism, the teachings and beliefs of Tablighi Jamat have been a cornerstone for joining in radical Muslim groups. 
By asking Muslims to "shun politics and public affairs", TJ leaves "a gap" in members' worldview/belief system; since "some people find they cannot ignore what is happening in the world around them, especially when that world includes wars". When jihadist groups "offer religiously sanctioned prescriptions as to how 'good Muslims' should deal with life's injustices", some TJ members listen.
In addition, Mumtaz Ahmad notes, its "apolitical stance" has helped reassure Muslim and non-Muslim states, governments and others who put severe restrictions on politically activist Islamic groups; it allows TJ to penetrate and operate in these societies.
 Thus TJ provides "a cover, a conduit and a fertile recruiting ground for jihadi organizations such as Al Qaeda and Lashkar-i-Taiba". TJ has been said to enable Al-Qaida "by supporting recruitment in radical madrassas and fundraising at mosques all over Pakistan." Law enforcement officials says that Tablighi Jamaat's presence all around the world and its apolitical stance have been exploited by militant groups. A former homeland security employee described Tablighi Jamaat as a "trans-national Islamist network".  According to Alex Alexiev, "perhaps 80% percent of the Islamist extremists have come from Tablighi ranks, prompting French intelligence officers to call Tablighi Jamaat the 'antechamber of fundamentalism.'"  
 In addition, some argue Tablighi Jamaat is not as apolitical as it might first appear. According to Patrick Sukhdeo, TJ is an extremely secretive group and the core of the group does not disclose how it operates. Despite claims of being apolitical, it has ties with the political and military sector of countries such as Pakistan and Bangladesh.
The Tablighi Jamaat operates in every sense as a secret society in this country [Britain], as much as elsewhere [...] Its meetings are held behind closed doors. We don't know who attends them. How much money it has. It publishes no minutes or accounts. It doesn't talk about itself. It is extremely difficult to penetrate.

Some have compared the group's ideology to Khawarij whereas others point out that the Tablighi Jamaat takes a "traditionalist" approach to Islam in contrast to Khawarij's extremist and often heretical approach.

The Tablighi Jamaat tried to expand the Abbey Mills Mosque into the largest mosque in the United Kingdom. The plan attracted controversy, and the Tabligh was denied permission.

Bans of the group in different countries 
Tablighi Jamaat has been banned in Iran, Uzbekistan, Tajikistan and Kazakhstan, Russia and Saudi Arabia. In some Central Asian countries such as Uzbekistan, Tajikistan and Kazakhstan, where its puritanical preachings are viewed as extremist. In February 2020, a counter-terrorism operation in Russia led to the arrest of seven Tablighis and dismantled the terrorist cell affiliated to the Tablighi Jamaat. According to Russian intelligence, the terrorist cell was involved in dissemination of materials and radicalization. The Tablighi Jamaat has been banned in Russia since 2009. The Supreme Court of Russia also recommended the Tablighi Jamaat to be included into the list of terrorist groups monitored by the Kremlin. On 10 December 2021, Saudi Arabia further warned against Tablighi Jamaat, calling it a "danger to society" and "one of the gates of terrorism", while all forms of innovated Islamic preaching are already banned in the kingdom. The announcement was made by the country's Minister of Islamic Affairs, Dr Abdullatif Al Al-Sheikh. It is pertinent to note that all other Arab countries specifically Gulf Arabic countries such as United Arab Emirates, Qatar, Kuwait, Bahrain and Oman have Tablighi Jamat Maraakez (Centres) and many locals are openly involved in Tabligh activity.

COVID-19 pandemic 

Tablighi Jamaat attracted significant public and media attention during the COVID-19 pandemic.

Malaysia 

Between 27 February and 1 March 2020, the movement organised an international mass religious gathering at the Masjid Jamek in Sri Petaling, Kuala Lumpur in Malaysia. The Tablighi Jamaat gathering has been linked to more than 620 COVID-19 cases, making it the largest-known centre of transmission of the virus in Southeast Asia. The Sri Petaling event resulted in the biggest increase in COVID-19 cases in Malaysia, with almost two thirds of the 673 confirmed cases in Malaysia linked to this event by 17 March 2020. Most of the COVID-19 cases in Brunei originated here, and other countries including Indonesia, Singapore, Thailand, Cambodia, Vietnam and the Philippines have traced their cases back to this event. By 20 May 2020, Director-General of Health Noor Hisham Abdullah confirmed that 48% of Malaysia's COVID-19 cases (3,347) had been linked to the Sri Petaling tabligh cluster.

Indonesia 

Despite the outbreak, Tablighi Jamaat organised a second international mass gathering on 18 March in Gowa Regency near Makassar in South Sulawesi, Indonesia. Though the organisers initially rebuffed official directives to cancel the gathering, they subsequently complied and cancelled the gathering.

Pakistan 

Yet another gathering was organised in Pakistan near Lahore at Raiwind, for 250,000 people. The event was "called off" in response to the officials' requests, but the participants had already gathered and communed together. When they returned, the virus travelled with them, including two cases in the Gaza strip. During testing, around 40 members of the Tablighi Jamaat were found to be COVID-infected. Another 50 people including four Nigerian women, suspected to be the carriers of the virus were quarantined 50 km from Lahore. In Hyderabad, Sindh, 38 members of the organisation were found to be positive for coronavirus. Raiwind, the place where the event was held has been locked down by Pakistani authorities and the police arrested Tablighi Jamaat members from their offices in Sindh and Punjab for violating the law.

A member of the organisation stabbed a policemen while trying to escape from an isolation facility. Ninety-four more Tableeghi Jamaat members tested positive for the coronavirus on 31 March 2020 in Hyderabad, in the Sindh province.

India 

The Tablighi Jamaat wanted to  arrange the program somewhere in Vasai, Maharashtra. After the outbreak of COVID-19 in Maharashtra, the Government of Maharashtra and Mumbai Police called off the meeting. After the rejection from the Government of Maharashtra, the Nizamuddin faction the Tablighi Jamaat held the religious congregational program (Ijtema) in Nizamuddin West, Delhi. There were also other violation of rules by foreign speakers including misuse of tourist visa for missionary activities and not taking 14-day home quarantine for travellers from abroad.

The Nizamuddin Markaz Mosque added that the officials there"met the Ld. DM and apprised him of the stranded visitors and once again sought permission for the vehicles arranged by us," to clear the Markaz premises and take the devotees back home.

"Under such compelling circumstances there was no option for Markaz Nizamuddin but to accommodate the stranded visitors with prescribed medical precautions till such time that situation becomes conducive for their movement or arrangements are made by the authorities," the Tablighi Jamaat HQ said.

On March 21 the Markaz directed everyone "not to venture out until 9 PM as desired by the Hon’ble Prime Minister, therefore the plans to move back to their native places by way of means other than railways also did not materialise."

At least 24 of the attendees had tested positive for the virus among the 300 who showed symptoms by 31 March 2020. It is believed that the sources of infection were preachers from Indonesia. Many had returned to their states and also housed foreign devotees without the knowledge of local governments. and eventually started local transmissions especially in Tamil Nadu, Telangana, Karnataka, Jammu and Kashmir and Assam. The entire Nizamuddin West area has been cordoned off by the police as of 30 March, and medical camps have been set up. After evacuation from the markaz, of the scores of jamaat attendees, 167 of them were quarantined in a railway facility in south east Delhi amid concerns over their safety and transmission of the virus. The Tablighi Jamaat gathering emerged as one of India's major coronavirus hotspots in India, after 1445 out of 4067 cases were linked to attendees according to the Health Ministry. On 18 April 2020, Central Government said that 4,291 cases (or 29.8% Of the total 14,378 confirmed cases of COVID-19 in India) were linked to the Tablighi Jamaat, and these cases were spread across 23 states and Union Territories.

Questions have been raised as to how the Delhi Police, which under direct control of the Union Home Ministry headed by the Home Minister & the then Bharatiya Janata Party president Amit Shah allowed this event to proceed in the midst of a pandemic, while a similar event was prohibited in Mumbai by the Maharashtra Police. Once the COVID lockdown came into effect in Delhi from 22 March onwards, the missionaries remaining in the Nizamuddin Markaz were trapped, and the functionaries began to seek assistance from the authorities for their evacuation. As of 4 April, more than 1000 cases, representing 30% all confirmed cases in India, were linked to the Nizamuddin event.  Some 22,000 people that came in contact with the Tablighi Jamaat missionaries had to be quarantined.  On 31 March 2020, an FIR was filed against Muhammad Saad Kandhlawi and others by Delhi Police Crime Branch. On 8 April 2020, the Delhi Police traced Tablighi Jamaat leader Maulana Saad Kandhalvi in Zakirnagar in South-East Delhi, where he claimed to be under self-quarantine.

People associated with the ruling Hindutva-aligned Bharatiya Janata Party called out Indian Hindus to socially boycott Indian Muslims. This drew criticism from Arab leaders and the Organisation of Islamic Cooperation; the Prime Minister Narendra Modi responded: "the virus did not discriminate between people on the basis of faith, community, race or nationality".

On 12 October 2020, Mumbai court discharged the members with the order stating they didn't act negligently to spread COVID and didn't disobey to the orders of the Indian authorities.

Notable members
The Tablighi Jamaat has no membership lists nor formal procedures for membership, which makes it difficult to quantify and verify affiliations.

The former chief minister of the Pakistani province of Punjab, Pervaiz Elahi is also a strong supporter of the Tablighi Jamaat. During his tenure in 2011, 75 kanals of land were purchased for a Tablighi Jamaat mosque at the Raiwind Markaz.

The Former Pakistan Presidents- Farooq Leghari and Muhammad Rafiq Tarar were believed to be associated with the movement, the Indian president Dr Zakir Hussain was also affiliated with tabligh jammat

Singers, actors and models, including Attaullah Essa Khailwi, Gulzar Alam, Bacha, Alamzeb Mujahid, and Junaid Jamshed are also affiliated with the movement.

Former Lieutenant General and head of Inter-Services Intelligence Javed Nasir and General Mahmud Ahmed of the Pakistan Army both became members of Tablighi Jamaat during their service. The Tablighi Jamaat also has a notable following among Pakistani professional cricketers: Shahid Afridi, Mohammad (formerly "Youhana") Yousuf and the former cricketers Saqlain Mushtaq, Inzamam-ul-Haq, Mushtaq Ahmed, Saeed Anwar and Saeed Ahmed are active members. Mohammad Yousuf's conversion from Christianity to Islam is widely attributed to the influence of the Tabligh Jamaat.

In Malaysia, prominent actors and singers such as Azmil Mustapha, Nabil Ahmad, Aliff Aziz, Anuar Zain, Amar Asyraf, Dato' Nash and Dr Sam have all been involved with Tablighi Jamaat. One of Malaysia's most prominent actress Neelofa, has also participated in Tablighi Jamaat's Tours with her husband (PU Riz), as a result of which she now dons the Islamic face veil ever since.

See also 
 List of Deobandi organisations
 Darul Uloom Deoband
 Islamisation
 Jama Mosque, Nerul
 Spread of Islam
 Dawat-e-Islami

References

Notes

Citations

Bibliography
Ali, Jan A. (2012).Islamic Revivalism Encounters the Modern World: A Study of the Tabligh Jama'at. New Delhi:  Sterling Publishers. .

Further reading

 Alex Alxiev, Tablighi Jamaat: Jihad's Stealthy Legions, Middle East Quarterly, Winter 2005, pp. 3–11
 
 
 Ali, Jan A. (2012). Islamic Revivalism Encounters the Modern World: A Study of the Tablīgh Jamā‘at. New Delhi: Sterling Publishers. 
 
 
 
 
 Snehesh Alex Philip, What is Tablighi Jamaat? Organiser of Delhi event behind spike in India's Covid-19 count, The Print, 31 March 2020.
 
 
 
 Jenny Taylor, What is the Tablighi Jamaat?, The Guardian, 8 September 2009.

External links 

 

 
1927 establishments in India
Islamic organisations based in India
Islamic organizations established in 1926
Sunni Islamist groups
Organizations associated with the COVID-19 pandemic
Deobandi organisations